XEPET-AM/XHPET-FM (La Voz de los Mayas – "The Voice of the Mayas") is an indigenous community radio station that broadcasts in Spanish and Yucatec Maya from Peto (130 km south of the state capital Mérida) in the Mexican state of Yucatán.

It is run by the Cultural Indigenist Broadcasting System (SRCI) of the National Commission for the Development of Indigenous Peoples (CDI).

It originally started broadcasting on 29 November 1982 on 740 kHz, but relocated to 730 kHz in January 2001. The FM station was authorized on June 4, 2010.

External links
XEPET website
The Negotiation of Indigenist Radio Policy in Mexico (on World Association of Community Radio Broadcasters website, with specific focus on the experiences of XEPET-AM)

References

Sistema de Radiodifusoras Culturales Indígenas
Mayan-language radio stations
Radio stations in Yucatán
Yucatec Maya language
Radio stations in Mexico with continuity obligations

Radio stations established in 1982